The 1879 Atlantic hurricane season ran from the summer to near the end of autumn in 1879. In 1879 there were two tropical storms, four hurricanes, and two major hurricanes (Category 3+). However, in the absence of modern satellite and other remote-sensing technologies, only storms that affected populated land areas or encountered ships at sea were recorded, so the actual total could be higher. An undercount bias of zero to six tropical cyclones per year between 1851 and 1885 and zero to four per year between 1886 and 1910 has been estimated. Of the known 1879 cyclones, Hurricane One were first documented in 1995 by Jose Fernandez-Partagas and Henry Diaz. They also proposed large changes to the known tracks of Hurricanes Two, Three, Seven and Eight. Later one storm was deemed not to be a tropical cyclone at all and was dropped from the database.



Season summary 

The Atlantic hurricane database (HURDAT) recognizes eight tropical cyclones for the 1879 season. Two were tropical storms and six were hurricanes, with winds of 75 mph (119 km/h) or greater. The first storm of the season formed as a tropical storm off the Carolinas on August 9. It briefly reached Category 1 hurricane strength before dissipating on August 12 off Newfoundland. The second cyclone of the year was a major Category 3 hurricane. Known as The Great Beaufort Hurricane, it caused extensive damage to both North Carolina and Virginia. Hurricane Three made landfalls at both the Yucatan Peninsula and near Galveston, Texas, causing great damage along the Louisiana coast. Hurricane Four was the second Category 3 cyclone of the year and, like Hurricane Three, also struck the Gulf coast. In this case the damage and destruction were centred on Morgan City, Louisiana. Tropical Storm Five existed between October 3 and 7th and dissipated over Louisiana. Tropical Storm Six travelled from east of Barbados to make landfall first on Isla de la Juventud, then Cuba and later Florida. Hurricane Seven began as a tropical storm in the Caribbean Sea, before crossing Florida and travelling north, parallel to the US east coast. The last cyclone of the year was a Category 2 hurricane that developed from a tropical storm as it travelled from close to Hispaniola to a point off Atlantic Canada before dissipating on November 20.

Timeline

Systems

Hurricane One 

A tropical storm was first discovered on August 9, offshore of the Carolinas. It grew to a Category 1 hurricane as it paralleled the North Carolina coast throughout August 11. It moved out to sea, dissipating offshore of Atlantic Canada on August 12.

Hurricane Two 

The Great Beaufort Hurricane of 1879 was first seen on August 13 as a tropical storm near the Windward Islands. It passed to the north of the islands, and became a hurricane near the Bahamas on August  16. It continued northward, and hit eastern North Carolina on the morning of August 18 as a  hurricane. At 6 a.m. that morning anemometer cups at Cape Lookout were blown away when indicating  and the wind was afterward estimated to have reached . A storm surge up to 8 feet high was seen at Norfolk, Virginia.
After crossing the state it moved into the northwestern Atlantic, crossing Cape Cod and Nova Scotia before becoming extratropical on August 20. The hurricane was responsible for 46 deaths, as well as great damage in North Carolina and Virginia.

Hurricane Three 

A tropical storm was first seen in the Western Caribbean on August 19. On August 20, it made landfall in the Yucatan Peninsula as a Category 1 hurricane. The hurricane weakened to a tropical storm and restrengthened into a hurricane in the Gulf of Mexico. There it reached its peak intensity of 100 mph and a minimal pressure of 964 mb. It made landfall east of Galveston, Texas near the border with Louisiana. At Calcasieu Pass a wave grounded twelve vessels high and dry. Further along the Louisiana coast many buildings were destroyed and crops ruined. The system rapidly weakened and dissipated on August 24.

Hurricane Four 

The Louisiana Hurricane of 1879

A tropical storm was first seen on August 28 in the Gulf of Mexico. By the end of the next day it had strengthened into a Category 2 hurricane, and by the end of August 31, it had reached Category 3 status. Throughout the morning of September 1 the hurricane maintained wind speeds of 130 mph while making landfall in Louisiana, near Morgan City. Damage was extensive - trees were uprooted, a sawmill, some cabins and two churches were destroyed while flooding washed away bridges. One person died.  It weakened to a Category 2 hurricane by the end of September 1, and the next day weakened further to a tropical depression. Hurricane Four caused $500,000 in damage.

Tropical Storm Five 

A tropical storm formed on October 2, about halfway between Jamaica and Panama. It grazed Cuba and made landfall in Louisiana before it dissipated on October 7.

Tropical Storm Six 

A tropical storm was first seen on October 8 east of Barbados. On October 9 it moved through the Leeward and Windward Islands. It moved across the Caribbean and passed near Jamaica on October 12. On October 13, the storm made landfall on Isla de la Juventud and on Cuba itself shortly thereafter. Early on October 16, it made landfall on the Florida Panhandle and dissipated later that day.

Hurricane Seven 

A tropical storm was discovered in the northwestern Caribbean Sea on October 24. It made landfall in Florida in the Big Bend Area as a 70 mph tropical storm. Later the storm paralleled the Eastern Seaboard of the United States and Atlantic Canada. On October 29 it briefly became a Category 1 hurricane before it dissipated the same day.

Hurricane Eight 

On November 18, a tropical storm formed to the north of Hispaniola. It grew to a Category 1 hurricane the next day. On November 20 it reached its peak intensity of 100 mph winds, before becoming extratropical. The extratropical storm affected Atlantic Canada with winds equivalent to a Category 1 hurricane.

See also 

 Tropical cyclone observation
 Atlantic hurricane reanalysis project

References

External links 
 HURDAT Data for the 1879 Atlantic hurricane season

 
Atlantic Hurricane Season, 1879
Articles which contain graphical timelines
1879 natural disasters